Allenella belli, also known as the beautiful pinhead snail, is a species of land snail that is endemic to Australia's Lord Howe Island in the Tasman Sea.

Description
The depressedly turbinate shell of the mature snail is 1.6 mm in height, with a diameter of 2.4 mm, and a low conical spire. It is amber to golden in colour. The whorls are rounded, with impressed sutures and distinct radial ribs. It has an ovately lunate aperture and narrowly open umbilicus.

Distribution and habitat
This rare snail has a distribution limited to the summits and upper slopes of the island's southern mountains. The only live specimens were collected from shrubs and tree trunks.

References

 
 

 
belli
Gastropods of Lord Howe Island
Taxa named by Tom Iredale
Gastropods described in 1944